Qaleh-ye Pain may refer to:
 Qaleh-ye Pain, Bavanat
 Qaleh-ye Pain, Marvdasht
 Qaleh-ye Pain Baram
 Qaleh-ye Pain Deh Shah